Raven Keyes is a Reiki master teacher and memoir writer based in New York City.

Background and career
Keyes is a certified Reiki master with two decades of experience in the healing arts. In addition to her private practice, she is a regular contributor to Reiki News and has written for Psychology Today. Keyes has been teaching her own brand of meditation called Healing Light Meditation at Equinox Fitness Clubs in New York since 1997.

Reiki background
A client brought Keyes into the medical world when she requested her presence for a heart operation with legendary surgeon, Dr. Mehmet Oz. Dr. Oz granted his permission and Keyes entered the operating room, becoming the first Reiki master to administer Reiki during open-heart surgery. After that, Keyes was invited to join Dr. Oz's research team as part of the original Complementary Care services program at Columbia Presbyterian Hospital. This resulted in her becoming the first Reiki master to launch a double lung transplant at the hospital. Having lectured to staff at the Rogosin Institute at Cornell Hospital, Keyes continued to work in the medical world, providing Reiki during chemotherapy sessions. She also sees the patients of Dr. Sheldon Feldman, Chief of Breast Surgery at New York Presbyterian Hospital/Columbia University Medical Center, providing Reiki before, during and after their breast cancer surgeries.
Raven teaches Reiki certification training in addition to hosting spiritual workshops and retreats around the world. Her work as a Reiki master has been featured on Martha Stewart's Whole Living Daily, Columbia University's Department of Surgery website, and others. Her memoir, The Healing Power of Reiki: A Modern Master's Approach to Emotional, Spiritual and Physical Wellness, was published in 2012 with a foreword by Dr. Memhet Oz, who also featured Reiki on his show.

Bibliography
The Healing Power of Reiki: A Modern Master's Approach to Emotional, Spiritual and Physical Wellness, New York, Llewellyn, 2012.

References

External links
Official Website
Reiki For Healing
Interview with Perk Up
NY Reiki Conference Interview

American memoirists
Living people
Reiki practitioners
Year of birth missing (living people)